James Thomas "Jumbo" Elliott (October 22, 1900 – January 7, 1970) was a professional baseball player.  He was a left-handed pitcher, playing in the major leagues over parts of ten seasons (1923, 1925, 1927–1934) with the St. Louis Browns, Brooklyn Robins, Philadelphia Phillies and Boston Braves.  He was the National League wins leader in 1931 with Philadelphia. For his major league career, he compiled a 63–74 record in 252 appearances, with a 4.24 ERA and 453 strikeouts.

He was born in St. Louis, Missouri. When he retired from baseball, he resided in Terre Haute, Indiana, the county seat of Vigo County. He first came to Terre Haute in 1922 as a pitcher for the Three-I League professional Class B minor league baseball team. Elliott was a long-time Deputy Sheriff in Vigo County and ran for Vigo County Sheriff as a Democrat in the 1968 election. His opponent was 6 ft 9 in (2.06 m) Clyde Lovellette, then retired from an extraordinary college and professional basketball career. The campaign earned national notoriety because both candidates were such big men (Elliott was approximately 6 ft 5 in and 250 lb, or 1.96 m and 113 kg) and sports celebrities. Lovellette won the election.

Elliott died in Terre Haute at age 69.

See also
 List of Major League Baseball annual wins leaders

External links

1900 births
1970 deaths
Major League Baseball pitchers
Baseball players from Missouri
St. Louis Browns players
Brooklyn Robins players
Philadelphia Phillies players
Boston Braves players
National League wins champions
Terre Haute Tots players
San Antonio Bears players
Seattle Indians players
Columbus Red Birds players
Indianapolis Indians players